Norkino is a rural locality (a village) in Petushinskoye Rural Settlement, Petushinsky District, Vladimir Oblast, Russia. The population was 7 as of 2010.

Geography 
Norkino is located on the Bolshaya Lipnya River, 21 km northeast of Petushki (the district's administrative centre) by road. Kobyaki is the nearest rural locality.

References 

Rural localities in Petushinsky District